In mathematical invariant theory, the catalecticant of a form of even degree is a polynomial in its coefficients that vanishes when the form is a sum of an unusually small number of  powers of linear forms. The word catalectic refers to an incomplete line of verse, lacking a syllable at the end or ending with an incomplete foot.

Binary forms

The catalecticant of a binary form of degree 2n is a polynomial in its coefficients that vanishes when the binary form is a sum of at most n powers of linear forms .

The catalecticant of a binary form can be given as the determinant of a catalecticant matrix , also called a  Hankel matrix, that  is a square matrix with constant (positive sloping) skew-diagonals, such as

Catalecticants of quartic forms

The catalecticant of a quartic form is the resultant of its second partial derivatives. For binary quartics the catalecticant vanishes when the form is a sum of two 4th powers. For a ternary quartic the catalecticant vanishes when the form is a sum of five 4th powers. For quaternary quartics the catalecticant vanishes when the form is a sum of nine 4th powers. For quinary quartics the catalecticant vanishes when the form is a sum of fourteen 4th powers.

References

Invariant theory